Bemolanga  is a large oil sands deposit in the onshore Morondava Basin of Madagascar. The deposit was discovered in the early 1900s but was known to locals for centuries. The field is located north of the Tsimiroro heavy oil field and east of the town of Morafenobe.

Madagascar Oil is a license holder of the Bemolanga field with 40% stake belonging to Total S.A. Madagascar Oil describes the field as being a giant bitumen field of 8-13ºAPI low sulphur (<1%) and low vanadium ultra heavy oil. In July 2018, Grynberg Petroleum, a US based company, started considering the acquiring of some interest in the Bemolanga field.

The source rocks for the Bemolanga oil is believed to be the Karoo formation of the Middle Sakamena Shale. The field was lifted to its present near surface location due to the renewed uplifting and seaward tilting of the island of Madagascar, which started in Late Cretaceous (Turonian) and continued throughout the Cenozoic era.

Thirteen wells and over 500 core-holes were drilled from the 1950s to the early 1980s. The prospective surface mining area is defined by wherever there is less than  depth to top oil sand.

In September 2008, Total S.A. acquired a 60% interest and operatorship of Bemolanga. It agreed a 2-year program to drill 130 additional core wells at a cost of US$200 million. Total began its own field work in mid 2009, with the start-up of commercial production planned for 2018. If development of the field is successful, it is expected that  of recoverable resources will be developed to produce  of oil for more than 30 years.

The Bemolanga field gives its name to the homonymous song by the Malagasy group, Mahaleo.

References
 Madagascar Oil website
 Bemolanga brochure
 Pete Jeans (Exploration Consultant)
 Heavy Oil Info
 Rigzone
 XE.com
 Grafton Resources

External links
 DeGolyer & MacNaughton (petroleum consultants)
 Grafton Resources website

Oil fields of Madagascar
Bituminous sands